This list is of the Cultural Properties of Japan designated in the category of  for the Prefecture of Yamaguchi.

National Cultural Properties
As of 1 September 2020, eight Important Cultural Properties have been designated, being of national significance.

Prefectural Cultural Properties
As of 1 May 2020, sixteen properties have been designated at a prefectural level.

See also
 Cultural Properties of Japan
 List of National Treasures of Japan (historical materials)
 List of Historic Sites of Japan (Yamaguchi)
 List of Cultural Properties of Japan - paintings (Yamaguchi)

References

External links
  Cultural Properties in Yamaguchi Prefecture

Cultural Properties,historical materials
Cultural Properties,historical materials
Historical materials,Yamaguchi